Joseph Booth (1871–1931) was an English footballer who played in the Football League for Bury.

References

1871 births
1931 deaths
English footballers
Association football inside forwards
English Football League players
Rochdale A.F.C. players
Bury F.C. players